Aik Pal  is a Pakistani family drama which aired on Hum TV. It is written by Sarwat Nazir. It stars Affan Waheed, Arij Fatyma, Danish Taimoor and Sumbul Iqbal in lead roles.

Summary
Sagacious and intellectual Noor Fatima who loses her father at an early age and lives with her paternal uncle along with her mother, wants to study further in a university. She eventually gets an admission after getting forcefully engaged to her cousin Imran. Mus'haf is a religious guy (just like Noor Fatima) while Umair and Bareera are arrogant and haughty persons. Their tracks unite when they get an admission in a single university.

Cast
 Affan Waheed as Musaf
 Arij Fatima as Bareera
 Danish Taimoor as Umair
 Sumbul Iqbal as Noor Fatima
 Tariq Jameel as Noor Fatima's uncle
 Nargis Rasheed as Noor Fatima's aunt
 Mehmood Akhtar as Salman
 Mohsin Gillani as Umair's father
 Tabbasum Arif as Umair's mother
 Naima Khan as Noor Fatima's mother
 Hira Pervaiz as Beena
 Ali Safina as Imran
 Shakeel Hussain Khan as Nadeem
 Farhana Maqsood as Imran's girlfriend
 Hanzala Shahid (Child actor)
 Mariam Ansari as Mehreen
 Muneeb Butt

References

Pakistani drama television series
Urdu-language television shows
Hum TV original programming
Serial drama television series
2014 Pakistani television series debuts
2015 Pakistani television series endings
7th Sky Entertainment